Graham and Graeme may refer to:

People
 Graham (given name), an English-language given name
 Graham (surname), an English-language surname
 Graeme (surname), an English-language surname
 Graham (musician) (born 1979), Burmese singer
 Clan Graham, a Scottish clan
 Graham baronets

Fictional characters 
 Graham Aker, in the anime Gundam 00
 Project Graham, what a human would look like to survive a car crash
 Graham, the head of the royal family of Daventry in the King's Quest series of video games

Places

Canada
 Graham, Sudbury District, Ontario
 Graham Island, part of the Charlotte Island group in British Columbia
 Graham Island (Nunavut), Arctic island in Nunavut

United States
 Graham, Alabama
 Graham, Arizona
 Graham, Florida
 Graham, Georgia
 Graham, Daviess County, Indiana
 Graham, Fountain County, Indiana
 Graham, Kentucky
 Graham, Missouri
 Graham, North Carolina
 Graham, Oklahoma
 Graham, Texas
 Graham, Washington

Elsewhere
 Graham Land, Antarctica
 Graham Island (Mediterranean Sea), British name for a submerged volcanic island in the Mediterranean Sea

Transport
 Graham Street light rail station, Melbourne, Australia (previously named Graham)

Other uses 
 Graham (satellite), NASA satellite
 Graham flour, a type of flour similar to whole wheat flour
 Graham cracker, a baked good made from Graham flour
 Graham factors, factors for determining ambiguity in U.S. patent law (see Inventive step and non-obviousness or Graham v. John Deere Co.)
 Graham (mango), a named mango cultivar originating in Trinidad.
 Graham number, a figure used in value investing
 Graham escapement, a type of clockwork escapement
 Graham's, a producer of port wine
 Graham's number, the largest number that has ever been seriously used in a mathematical proof
 Graham scan, a method of computing a convex hull
 Graham and Graham-Paige, automobile makers in Detroit, USA, between 1928 and 1940
 Graham technique, a modern dance style

See also
 
 
 Gram
 Gramm (disambiguation)
 Graham County (disambiguation)
 Graham Township (disambiguation)